Stromboceros is a genus of insects belonging to the family Tenthredinidae.

The species of this genus are found in Europe and America.

Species:
 Stromboceros albimaculatus Rohwer 
 Stromboceros assamensis Rohwer 
 Stromboceros delicatulus

References

Tenthredinidae
Sawfly genera